King was an electoral district in the Australian state of New South Wales. It was created in 1904 as a result of the 1903 New South Wales referendum, which required the number of members of the Legislative Assembly to be reduced from 125 to 90. It largely replaced Sydney-King, losing a part to Darling Harbour. It was expanded to include parts of Sydney-Fitzroy and Sydney-Bligh. It also included Lord Howe Island, Montague Island and South Solitary Island.

In 1920 NSW introduced proportional representation and the district was absorbed into the multi-member electorate of Sydney. NSW returned to single member electorates in 1927 and King was recreated. It was abolished in 1973 and absorbed into the neighbouring electorates of Phillip, Balmain and Marrickville.

Members for King

Election results

References 

Former electoral districts of New South Wales
Constituencies established in 1904
1904 establishments in Australia
Constituencies disestablished in 1920
1920 disestablishments in Australia
Constituencies established in 1927
1927 establishments in Australia
Constituencies disestablished in 1973
1973 disestablishments in Australia